San Cono is one of the frazioni (subdivisions, mainly villages and hamlets) of Rometta comune (municipality) in the Province of Messina in the Italian region Sicily

Frazioni of the Metropolitan City of Messina
Rometta